Lawrence Cordill Robinson (born April 6, 1951) is a former professional American football running back in the National Football League, who played for the Dallas Cowboys. He played college basketball for the University of Tennessee.

Early years
Robinson attended Carver-Price High School in Virginia, before moving on to Ferrum College. He helped his team reach the NJCAA National Tournament in consecutive years and received NJCAA All-American honors in 1971.

He transferred to the University of Tennessee for the 1971-1972 season and became the school's second African American basketball player (Wilbert Cherry was the first one). He contributed to the team being the SEC co-champion.

The next year, he was named team captain. He finished his career with an average of 10.9 ppg and 8.8 rpg, while shooting 60% from the floor. He led the team in field-goal shooting and rebounding in both years.

In 1994, he was inducted into the Ferrum College Sports Hall of Fame.

Professional career
Robinson was signed as an undrafted free agent after the 1973 NFL draft. He was a college basketball player who never played a down of college football, that the Dallas Cowboys converted into a running back.

On September 19, he was placed on the inactive list and spent most of the season on the taxi squad. As a rookie, he played in 4 games and was used mainly as a kick returner. He was waived on September 10, 1974.

Personal life
Robinson became the first African American coach in the history of the University of Tennessee, when he was hired as an assistant football coach on October 8, 1974.

References

External links
Ferrum College Sports Hall of Fame bio

1951 births
Living people
African-American basketball players
American football running backs
Ferrum Panthers men's basketball players
Tennessee Volunteers basketball players
Dallas Cowboys players
People from Appomattox, Virginia
American men's basketball players
21st-century African-American people
20th-century African-American sportspeople